is a Japanese musician and actor from Nishinomiya, Hyōgo Prefecture.

Biography
His father is rakugo performer Shōfukutei Tsurube II. He graduated from Shinko Gakuen Shinko High School and Osaka University of Arts Junior College. After studying in England for two years, he made his debut music release on the label Polystar as "taro" in 2003. After that, he formed the band "sleepydog", performing vocals and guitar. In 2008, when he became 30 years old, he decided to turn to acting. He has appeared in both films and television dramas.

In February 2011, he finished his "sleepydog" activities and started, along with sleepydog guitarist Takayuki Moriya. a new unit named "Human Note".

From 3 October 2011, he played the main role of Masaru Kawamoto in the Carnation television series (broadcast by NHK Asadora Osaka Broadcasting Station). 

In 2013, he played a role in Tokyo Broadcasting System Television's Hanzawa Naoki.

Appearances

Films
Detroit Metal City (23 Aug 2008, Toho) – as Tetra Pot Melon Ti Watanabe
Cho Kamen Rider Den-O & Decade Neo Generations: The Onigashima Warship (1 May 2009, Toei Company)
Kondo wa Aisai-ka (16 Jan 2010, Toei Company)
Troubleshooting! The Ancient Dogoo Girl: Special Movie Edition (20 Feb 2010, Nikkatsu) – as Yosuke Isobe
Bakuhatsu! Suke-ban Hunters Sōkatsu Magurikomi Sakusen (29 May 2010, United Entertainment) – as Kato
The Lone Scalpel (5 Jun 2010, Toei Company) – as Kobayashi
Flowers (12 Jun 2010, Toho) – as Taichi Hirano
Saiban-chō! Koko wa Chōeki 4-nen de dō suka (6 Nov 2010, Therearez Enterprise)
SP The Motion Picture Kakumei-hen (12 Mar 2011, Toho) – as Sawajiri
Runway Beat (19 Mar 2011, Shochiku)
Tomie Unlimited (14 May 2011, T-Joy/CJ Entertainment Japan)
Tezuka Osamu no Buddha -Akai Sabaku yo! Utsukushiku- (28 May 2011, Toei Company/Warner Bros.) – as executioner (voice)
Buddha 2: Tezuka Osamu no Buddha -Owarinaki Tabi- (8 Feb 2014, Toei Company) – as Baddika (voice)
Princess Toyotomi (28 May 2011, Toho)
Helldriver (23 Jul 2011, Nikkatsu) – as Ishino
Gekiatsu –Manatsu no Etude– (20–21 Aug 2011, West Power/West Discovery Film) – as Tetsuo Kumada
Kamisama no Karute (27 Aug 2011, Toho)
Gokudō Meshi (23 Sep 2011, Showgate) – as Mitsuharu Kotani
Kurosawa Eiga 2011 –Warai ni Dekinai Koi ga aru– (26 Nov 2011, Phantom Film) – as Morita
Inu no Kubiwa to Croquette to (28 Jan 2011, Phantom Film) – as Yasushimoto
Arakawa Under the Bridge: The Movie (4 Feb 2012, Sony Pictures Entertainment Japan) – as Last Samurai
Subete wa "Hadaka ni naru" kara Hajimatte (11 Feb 2012, Banana Fish) – as Machida
Ouran High School Host Club (17 Mar 2012, Sony Pictures Entertainment Japan) – as Secretary Lawrence
Home Itoshino Zashikiwarashi (28 Apr 2012, Toei Company) – as Saito
The Boy Inside (22 Sep 2012, United Entertainment)
Tabi no Okurimono Ashita e (27 Oct 2012, Kino Films)
Kita no Kanaria-tachi (3 Nov 2012, Toei Company) – as Toda
Fly With the Gold (3 Nov 2012, Shochiku)
Soul Flower Train (31 Aug 2013, Enesai) – as Hajime Tachibana
Miss Zombie (14 Sep 2013, Live Viewing Japan)
Kimi o Omou (12 Oct 2013, Asmik Ace/Toho) – as Hiraiwa
Short Movie Crash 2013 1st "Crash Return of the bad girl" (26 Oct 2013, Adways Pictures)
The Eternal Zero (21 Dec 2013, Toho)
Girl in the Sunny Place (2014) – as Wataru
Crows Explode (12 Apr 2014, Toho)
A Family (24 May 2014, Warner Bros.) – as Furuya
Climbing to Spring (14 Jun 2014, Toho) – as Taichi Nishimura
Naniwa Zenidō (12 Jul 2014, Rakueisha) – as Atsushi Usui
The Next Generation: Patlabor Chapter 6 (29 Nov 2014, Shochiku Media Division) – as Yoshida
Kakashi to Racket –Aki to Tamako no Natsuyasumi– (4 Apr 2015, Aeon Entertainment) – as Kazuo Ozuki
7s (7 Nov 2015, Bead International)
Yume ni–Ai no tobashiri (30 Jul 2016, Best Brain) – Starring-as Yumeji Takehisa
Sanada 10 Braves (22 Sep 2016, Nikkatsu/Shochiku) – as Miyoshi Seikai 
Cinderella Game (2016, AMG Entertainment) – as Takimoto
Her Love Boils Bathwater (2016, Clockworks) – as Takimoto
Samurai's Promise (2018)
The Blood of Wolves (2018, Toei) – as Jirō Uesawa
Bunbuku Chagama (2018, ABC Livra)
A Family (2021, Star Sands, Kadokawa)
Every Trick in the Book (2021, Shochiku)
Zenbu, Boku no Sei (2022) as Ryo Shiraishi
Hard Days (2023)
Oshorin (TBA)

TV dramas
Rinjō Dai 1-shō Episode 4 (6 May 2009, EX) – as Yamamoto
Tsure ga Utsu ni Narimashite (29 May – 12 Jun 2009, NHK) – as Jiro Kato
Saturday Night at the Mysteries Shinbun Kisha Goro Tsurumaki 3 (29 Aug 2009, EX) – as Narimiya
Yusuke Kamiji no Genki no deru Koi Episodes 6–10 (1 Sep 2009 – All 12 episodes × 5 minutes, BeeTV) – as Kazuya
The Ancient Dogoo Girl Episode 5 (4 Nov 2009, MBS) – as Yosuke Isobe
Taiga drama (NHK)
Ryōmaden Episode 4 – Final Episode (24 Jan – 28 Nov 2010) – as Seikichi Nogami
Taira no Kiyomori Episode 14 – Final Episode (8 Apr – 23 Dec 2012) – as Taira no Tsunemori
SMAP×SMAP Hontōni atta Koi no Hanashi 2 Episode6 "Sewa-yakuna Koi" (24 May 2010, CX) – as Sanda
Clone Baby (8 Oct – 17 Dec 2010, TBS) – as Haruki Wakabayashi
Q10 Episode 2 (23 Oct 2010, NTV) – as Chaka
Seicho Matsumoto Special: Kyūkei no Arano (26–27 Nov 2010, CX) – as Detective Ogura
Heaven's Flower The Legend of Arcana (12 Jan – 4 Mar/12–13 Sep 2011, TBS) – as Zenji Sudo
Try Age –Sansedai no Chōsen– Episode 2 "Kazuya Kaneda Mitsuyo no Monogatari" (10 Feb 2011, NHK BShi) – as Shinkichi Hashimoto
Saturday Night at the Mysteries Ai to Shi no Kyōkai-sen (26 Mar 2011, ABC)
Shimashima (22 Apr – 24 Jun 2011, TBS) – as Hiiragi Futaba
Getsuyō Golden Zeimu Chōsakan Taro Madogiwa no Jiken-bo 22 (27 Jun 2011, TBS) – as Tomoyuki Naruse
Arakawa Under the Bridge (26 Jul – 27 Sep 2011, MBS) – as Last Samurai
Unfair the special –Double Meaning Nijūteigi– (23 Sep 2011, KTV – as Director
Double Meaning Yes or No? (1 Mar 2013) – as Producer
Last Money: Ai no Nedan Episode 3 (27 Sep 2011, NHK) – as Ozawa
Asadora Carnation Episodes 33–60 (9 Nov – 10 Dec 2011, NHK) – as Sho Ohara (Kawamoto)
Kasōken no Onna Dai 11 Series Episode 4 (10 Nov 2011, EX) – as Hiroshi Takasaki
Kaitō Royale Episode 6 (2 Dec 2011, TBS) – as Yuta Ito
Saiko no Jinsei Episodes 3–4, 7, Final Episode (26 Jan–2, 23 Feb, 15 Mar, TBS) – as Sota Ichinose
3.11 Sonohi, Ishinomaki de Nani ga Okita no ka –6-mai no Kabeshinbun– (6 Mar 2012, NTV)
Friend-Ship Project –Taku no Taxi– (31 Mar 2012, TX) – Starring; as Taku Tanaka
Kaneko Misuzu Monogatari –Minna chigatte, minna ī– (9 Jul 2012, TBS) – as Kensuke Kaneko
Kuro no Jokyōshi (20 Jul – 21 Sep 2012, TBS) – as Taro Noguchi
Ōoku–Tanjō [Yūkō-Iemitsu-hen] Episodes 1 and 2 (12–19 Oct 2012, TBS) – as Myoe
Pillow Talk –Bed no Omowaku– Episode 4 (25 Oct 2012, KTV) – as Koji Koizumi
Irodori Himura Episode 7 (26 Nov 2012, TBS) – as Imai
Kuroyuri Danchi ~Josho~ Episodes 1–2, 11–12 (9–16 Apr, 18–25 Jun 2013, TBS) – as Yosuke Imura
Take Five –Oretachi wa Ai o Nusumeru ka– (19 Apr – 21 Jun 2013, TBS) – as Bartender/Takashi Kogori
Kuroi 10-ri no Hitomi Kuroki III "Kuroi Shachō," "Kuroi Senpai" (30 Jun 2013, NHK BS Premium)
Hanzawa Naoki Part 2 (25 Aug – 22 Sep 2013, TBS) – as Tadashi Yuasa
Yorozu Uranai Sho Onmyō-ya e yōkoso (8 Oct – 17 Dec 2013, KTV) – as Hideyuki Makihara
Hanasaku Ashita (5 Jan – 23 Feb 2014, NHK BS Premium) – as Kazuki Miyazaki
Border: Keishichō Sōsa Ichi-ka Satsujin-han Sōsa Dai 4 Kakari Episode 3 (24 Apr 2014, EX) – as Yasuo Shimamura
Sanuki udon Yūshi-ka (21 May 2014, NHK BS Premium) – as Haruhiko Shigematsu
Roosevelt Game Episode 6 (1 Jun 2014, TBS) – as Hideo Sawaki
Kindaichi Shōnen no Jikenbo N (neo) Episodes 5–6 (16–23 Aug 2014, NTV) – as Toru Shimonomiya
Endless Affair–Owari naki Jōji (23–30 Aug 2014, LaLa TV) – as Yoji Tamura
Drama Special: Iryū Sōsa (19 Oct 2014, EX) – as Shoichi Kuzumaki
Sakura –Jiken o Kiku Onna– (20 Oct – 22 Dec 2014, TBS) – as Saburo Kajiwara
Watashitachi ga Propose sa renai no ni wa, 101 no Riyū ga atteda na Episode 2 (11 Nov 2014, LaLa TV) – as Takahiro
Shuryō Sekki (19 Nov 2014, KTV) – as Kunihiko Nanko
Tamagawa Kuyakusho Of The Dead Episodes 10–12 (5–19 Dec 2014, TX) – as Sakuranosuke Shimao
Suiyō Mystery 9 Tsumihi (10 Dec 2014, TX) – as Shinobu Wakamiya
Sono Otoko, Ishiki Takai Kei. (3 Mar 2015 –, NHK BS Premium) – as Takashi Ninomiya
Kasane Episode 4 (24 Mar 2015, TX) – as Dōzaki Yamamoto Hajime
Keishichō Sōsaikka 9 Kakari: season10 Episode 1 (22 Apr 2015, EX) – as Akira Toyohara
Lunch no Akko-chan (12 May – 30 Jun, NHK BS Premium)
Saikyō no futari –Kyoto Fukei Tokubetsu Sōsahan– Episode 5 (20 Aug 2015, EX) – as Shimsuke Shimamura
Tsuribaka Nisshi (23 Oct – 11 Dec 2015, TX) – as Masayuki Suzuki
Wakako Sake Season2 Episode 1 (8 Jan 2016, BS Japan) – as Admiral
Seicho Matsumoto Ni-yo Renzoku Drama Special Dai Ichi-yo Seicho Matsumoto Drama Special Chihōshi o Kau Onna–Sakka Ryuji Sugimoto no Suiri (12 Mar 2016, EX) – as Sakiji Shoda
Love Song (Apr–Jun 2016, CX) – as Kenta Nomura
Drama Special Gold Woman (28 May 2016, EX) – as Tsutomu Saita
Seisei suru hodo, Aishiteru Episode 2 (19 Jul 2016, TBS) – as Joichi Mori
Doyō Wide Gekijō Okashina Keiji 14 (22 Oct 2016, EX) – as Susumu Igarashi
Codename Mirage (2017) – Kohei Himeshima
Onna no Kunshō (15, 16 Apr 2017, CX) – as Keita Nomoto
Chīsana Kyojin (16 Apr – 18 Jun 2017, TBS) – as Ryoichi Fujikura
Keishichō Zero Kakari –Seikatsu Anzen-ka nan demo Sōdan-shitsu– Second Season (21 Jul 2017 –, TX) – as Haruuma Date
BS Shōten Drama Special Katsura Utamaru (9 Oct 2017, BS Nittele) – as Tatekawa Danshi VII
Akagi "Ryūzaki-Yagi-hen/Ichikawa-hen" (13 Oct – 10 Nov 2017, BS SkyPerfecTV!) – as Nango
Akahige (2017) – Fujiyoshi
Kansayaku Shuhei Nozaki (2018) – Masayoshi Sakamoto
Koshiji Fubuki Monogatari (2018) – Yoshio Shoji
The Kitazawas: We Mind Our Own Business Episode 4 (3 Feb 2018, TBS) – as Tsunoi
Idaten (2019, NHK) – as Haruhide Matsushita
Kirin ga Kuru (2020, NHK) – as Tsutsui Junkei
Bakumatsu Aibō-den (2022, NHK) – as Katsura Kogorō
Shin Shinchō Kōki (2022, NTV) – as Naomasa Ii

Variety
run for money Tōsō-chū (28 Sep 2014 – 29 Nov 2015, CX) – as Kakeru Kisaragi

Direct-to-video
Highway Battle R×R Vol.1 (19 Dec 2008, Avex Marketing) – as Keita Ishida
Highway Battle R×R Vol.2 (27 Feb 2009, Avex Marketing) – as Keita Ishida
Ayakashi Kagura (16 Sep 2011, GP Museum) – as Otomo-sensei

Music videos
Atsuko Maeda "Kimi wa Boku Da" (20 Jun 2012) – as Shinji
Osamu Kimura "(Emi)" (14 Nov 2012)

Stage
Rody Musical (2–6 Aug 2010, Sogetsu Hall) – as Cham
Warau Kyotō (3 Oct – 2 Dec 2012, Tokyo/Chihō) – as Nonomura
TV no namida (26–31 Mar 2013, Panasonic Globe Theatre – as Shinji Ogawa
Ken Yokoyama: Dai Zachō Kōen (6–9 May 2013, Asakusa Public Hall) – as Shinji Taki
Sanada Jūyūshi (7 Jan – 19 Feb 2014, Tokyo-Osaka/11 Sep – 23 Oct 2016, Tokyo-Kanagawa-Hyōgo) – as Kiyomi Miyoshi
Complex Sticker (14–18 May 2014, Ebisu Echo Theater)
Kira desuga, nani ka? (21 Nov – 14 Dec 2014, Honda Theater) – as Masatake
Hachigatsu Nōryō Kabuki: Kuruwa Hanashi Yamana-ya Urazato (9–28 Aug 2016, Kabuki-za Theater) – as Gyūtarō no Tomozō

Voice acting
UFC Gatekeeper TUF Two Class Tournament (30 Nov 2011 – 15 Feb 2012, Wowow) – as Stephen Siler (dubbing)

Advertisements
Sony α350 (Mar 2008 –)
Heian-kaku Marriyell (Aug 2008 –)
Shionogi Popon S (Mar 2009 –)
Chubu Electric Power "Denki ga Kurashi o Kaeru" (May 2009 –)
Cabinet Office "Kodomo Kosodate Shien–Mirai-tachi e" (Jun 2010 –)
Bathclin Yakuyō Nyūyoku-zai Bathclin (Oct 2010 –)
Kirin Brewery Kirin Free (28 Jan 2011 –)
Yamaki
Katsuobushi-ya no dashi men tsuyu (Apr 2011 –)
Katsuobushi-ya no dashi Kappō Shiradashi (Oct 2014 –)
Kao Corporation Attack Neo Kōkin EX Power (Mar 2012 –)
Sumitomo Mitsui Banking Corporation (19–25 Dec 2012)
Calpis "Calpis wa Suki?" (Mar 2013 –)
Nihon Full Hop (Mar 2013 –)
The Asahi Shimbun Company Asahi Shimbun (Mar 2014 –)

CS, cable television
Space Shower Music Update (Oct 2008 – Mar 2009, Space Shower TV) – Wednesday regular VJ
8-Jidesu! Namahōsō!! (9 Jul 2010 – 14 Dec 2012, J:Com Kansai 18 bureau) – Friday regular

Radio
Mozaiku Night –No.1 Music Factory– (5 Apr 2010 – 28 Mar 2011, bayfm78 – Monday personality

Discography

As taro

Singles
Dōshite konna ni Kanashī 'ndarou (25 Sep 2003)*Cover of Takuro Yoshida

Mini albums
Relationship (5 Feb 2003)
Loop To The Roots (27 Nov 2003)

With sleepydog

Singles
Start Line (19 Jul 2006)

Mini albums
air (22 Apr 2009)

Music provided
Ken Miyake "Yūgure Orange" (V6's album Voyager's Limited edition B included on its bonus CD)

Notes

References

External links
 – Ameba Blog 
 
 – FC2 (former blog) 
 – FC2 (former blog) 

Japanese male actors
Japanese male musicians
Actors from Hyōgo Prefecture
1978 births
Living people